The Independent Music Companies Association (IMPALA), originally the Independent Music Publishers and Labels Association, is a non-profit trade association established in 2000 to help European independent record labels represent their agenda and promote independent music. Its offices are in Brussels, Belgium.

IMPALA is a member of the Worldwide Independent Network (WIN), a coalition of independent music bodies from countries throughout the world.

History
IMPALA was founded in 2000 by national trade associations and key independent labels, as a non-profit organisation dedicated to small and medium-sized enterprises in the music industry.

In 2008 an Action Plan for Music was launched and in 2010 an Action Plan for Finance was published.

In January 2015, IMPALA launched its Digital Action Plan, a ten-point plan calling for a new European industrial policy to drive the digital market through the cultural and creative sectors. The action plan calls on the EU to reinforce copyright, and other key measures, including promoting diversity in a measurable way and devising a new regulatory, competition, social and fiscal framework for smaller actors.

To celebrate IMPALA's 15th anniversary, from September 2015 various initiatives took place across Europe under the "IMPALA 15" banner, such as the Reeperbahn Festival at Hamburg, Germany.

In March 2016, IMPALA launched a monthly feature to put the spotlight on Europe's most inspiring young independent labels, known as the Young Label Spotlight.
On 24 September 2018, Paul Pacifico, CEO of the UK's Association of Independent Music and Michel Lambot, co-founder and Co-President of the PIAS Group, co-represented IMPALA, the body representing European indie record labels, at the expert workshop organised by the Centre for Fine Arts in Brussels (BOZAR), the European Cultural Foundation and the British Council about Brexit and the cultural sector. The goal was "to reaffirm our shared intent and common values, and to produce practical recommendations from the cultural and creative sectors that go beyond those that have already been made", and a list of recommendations was afterwards published on the IMPALA website.

As part of its role of representing independent music companies at EU level, IMPALA was involved in the discussions on the EU Copyright Directive, and is working on competition issues such as Sony's buyout of EMI in 2018, or more recently the sale of Universal Music Group's shares.

In 2019 IMPALA acknowledged the climate emergency and committed to making the independent sector ecologically sustainable and regenerative, as well as using its voice to support Music Declares Emergency in Brussels.

In 2020, IMPALA established a COVID-19 Task Force and adopted a crisis plan, mapping tool and recovery package, as well as a set of second stage recommendations, helping culture to be recognised as one of Europe's fourteen priority sectors for recovery in the EU.

In October 2020 IMPALA adopted a Diversity and Inclusion Charter, a set of commitments dedicated to the European independent sector.   
 
In November 2020, The organisation announced a year long series of podcasts, playlists and other projects to celebrate IMPALA's 20th birthday on a dedicated blog page.

In March 2021, IMPALA launched IMPALA Campus, an EU-funded training programme for recorded music professionals and self-releasing artists taking place spring and summer 2021 in partnership with four leading music conferences across Europe.

On 23 March 2021, IMPALA released a paper “It’s Time to Challenge the Flow: How to make the most of the real opportunities of streaming” and a ten-point plan with recommendations to music services to reform streaming.

The IMPALA sustainability task force developed a sustainability programme which was published in April 2021. The programme includes European independent music sector carbon goals for 2026 (net zero) and 2030 (net positive), along with a 15-commitment climate charter, voluntary tools, tips and guidance for members of the association.

In July 2021, IMPALA and IAO released a proposal for a GECAT Pass (for Geographical European Cultural Area Touring), with the idea to get small and medium sized music tours back on the road quickly and efficiently. The approach involves creating a new cultural area with a single touring permit, instead of treating Europe as a number of distinct blocs and countries.

In March 2022, IMPALA made a statement on the war in Ukraine and has been encouraging support for the Ukrainian culture sector together with other European cultural associations.

On 29 March 2022, IMPALA launched a new programme to boost diversity in the European independent music sector in partnership with YouTube called “100 Artists to Watch”. This new programme replaces IMPALA’s annual European Independent Album of the Year Award, which had a great roll of 10 years.

In April 2022, the association and Julie’s Bicycle have launched the first bespoke carbon calculator for the independent music sector.

Members
 IMPALA has nearly 6000 members, including national associations as well independent music companies as direct members. The Board is elected by its members.

Labels 

 8 Ball Music
 Beggars Group
 Better Noise Music
 Blue Sun
 Cobalt Music Helladisc
 Cooking Vinyl
 Cosmos Music Group
 Despotz Records
 Edel AG
 Epitaph
 Everlasting Records
 Gazell Records
 GMI
 I love you Records
 !K7 Records
 Musikvertrieb
 [PIAS] Music Group
 Playground Music Scandinavia
 Red Bullet Productions
 SCL / Lusitanian
 Sugar Music
 Sundance Records
 The state51 Conspiracy
 Wagram Music
 Zebralution

National associations

 AIM (UK)
 AIM Ireland (Ireland)
 AMAEI (Portugal)
 ANPM (Poland)
 BIMA (Belgium)
 BMYD (Turkey)
 DUP (Denmark)
 FELIN (France)
 FONO (Norway)
 HAIL (Hungary)
 INDIECO (Finland)
 INDIERO (Romania)
 IndieSuisse (Switzerland)
 P.I.L. (Israel)
 Platforma (Czech Republic)
 PMI (Italy)
 RUNDA (Balkans)
 SOM (Sweden)
 STOMP (Netherlands)
 UFI (Spain)
 UPFI (France)
 VTMÖ (Austria)
 VUT (Germany)

Awards
IMPALA has three awards schemes: the 100 Artists to Watch Award, the Outstanding Contribution Award and the IMPALA Sales Awards.

References

Music industry associations
Organizations established in 2000
International organisations based in Belgium
Music organisations based in Belgium